The article contains information about the 2016–17 Iran 3rd Division football season. This is the 4th rated football league in Iran after the Persian Gulf Cup, Azadegan League, and 2nd Division. The league started from October 2016.

In total and in the first round, 65 teams will compete in 5 different groups .

First round

Group A

Group B

Group C

Group D

Group E

Second round

Second Round will be started after first round (January 2017)

Promotion and Relegation:

First team of each group (total: 3 teams) will promote to second division.

Teams ranked 2 in each group and the best 3rd place team, will promote to playoff round.

In playoff round, two teams of four, will promote to second division.
(Totally 5 teams will promote)

Other 3rd ranked teams who did not qualify to playoff round, and teams ranked 4th & 5th and the best placed 6th team (total: 11 teams) will play in second round of next season.

Teams ranked 7th or below and the two worst placed 6th teams will play in first round of next season.

Group A (North)

Group B (Center & East )

Group C (South)

Playoff

The winner will be promoted to 2017–18 Iran Football's 2nd Division.

References 

League 3 (Iran) seasons
4